The Fartist is a live comedy album by Brian Posehn. It was released in 2013 under New Wave Dynamics. The album's name and cover derives from the 2011 French film The Artist. PlutoTV streaming service has featured the program on the StandUp comedy channel.

Track listing
For My Wife - 1:24
Strippers and Stripping - 3:02
The Tale of a Stripper - 2:13
Quitting Weed - 3:12
The Scariest Pot Story Ever Told - 4:26
Do Not Punch My Baby - 5:07
Um... My Farts - 3:27
My Fart Meets Someone Famous - 6:57
Getting Old - 6:17
The Acopapypse - 4:55
Weird Al - 2:07
Taking Care of Business - 2:28
Getting Back on the Horse - 4:10
Dirty Jokes - 3:25
Star Wars, Pt. 3 (Yes, I'm Still Mad About Star Wars) - 3:48

References

2013 live albums
Brian Posehn albums
2010s comedy albums
Stand-up comedy albums